The Val di Chiana, Valdichiana, or Chiana Valley is an alluvial valley of central Italy, lying on the territories of the provinces of Arezzo and Siena in Tuscany and the provinces of Perugia and Terni in Umbria.

Geography 

It runs north to south between the plain of Arezzo and the plain of Orvieto and includes the watershed of the Canale Maestro della Chiana, its main watercourse, and the northern part of the watershed of the Chiana River.

The river Chiana (old name Clanis) since IV sec. BC was large and suitable for boats from Arezzo to the connection with the Tevere river (60 km). After the river floating and up to the XVI sec the bottom part of the valley was cover by the water for hundreds years. There is a map drawn by Leonardo da Vinci about this lake ( Map RCIN 912278 Royal Collection). The beauty of the valley and the excellent farming activity was mentioned by Pliny the elder in his Naturalis Historia III, 52-54. Goethe few hundreds years later wrote about Valdichiana:  «"Fields of such beauty are impossible to find elsewhere; every lump of earth has been tilled to perfection, prepared for sowing. Wheat grows lushly on this soil, where it seems to find all the necessary conditions to thrive. Every other year they plant horsebean, because oat does not flourish here. They also plant lupines, now already green, which will ripen by the month of March. Flax too, is already sown; buried into the ground throughout the winter, it is toughened by the freezing cold. ». Johann Wolfgang von Goethe, Italian Journey.

To the southeast, it reaches Lake Trasimeno and the valley of the Nestore River.

The landscape is mostly hilly, with a plain around the Canale Maestro della Chiana.

Products 
Valdichiana is near traditional local products such as wines, local wheat variety, olive oil, truffle, fruit, cattle breed and others.

The most known local products are:

Chianina cattle breed, the original ingredient for the "Bistecca alla Fiorentina"

Aglione della Valdichiana. A special local giant garlic with an aromatic and gentle taste. From 2019 is a DOP

Vinsanto Valdichiana Toscana DOC

Grechetto Valdichiana Toscana DOC

See also
Chianina, a breed of cattle which originated in the valley.
Vinsanto Valdichiana Toscana Doc
Aglione della Valdichiana
Battle of Marciano or Scannagallo
Foiano della Chiana's carnival - The oldest in Italy

External links 

Landforms of Tuscany
Valleys of Tuscany
Valleys of Umbria